Michael "Mike" Dixon (born 6 April 1971) is a former professional rugby league footballer who played in the 1980s, 1990s and 2000s.

Playing career

International honours
Dixon won three caps for Scotland between 1997 and 2001.

References

External links
Double boost for Rovers
Super Scots stun France

1971 births
Living people
English people of Scottish descent
English rugby league players
Hull F.C. players
Hull Kingston Rovers players
Rugby league hookers
Rugby league players from Kingston upon Hull
Scotland national rugby league team players